Brachidontes modiolus, or the Yellow mussel, is a species of bivalve mollusc in the family Mytilidae. It can be found along the Atlantic coast of North America, ranging from Florida to the West Indies.

References

Mytilidae
Molluscs described in 1767
Taxa named by Carl Linnaeus